Jag Star (just a girl singing to a radio) is an alternative rock/pop band from Knoxville, Tennessee.  Originally formed in late 1998, the band has released four independent records, and have a number of singles on a compilation album.  The band has seen several line up changes and has toured extensively since 2000.  Of the original line up listed on the band’s first EP “The Beginning”, only Sarah and J Lewis remain.  Erin (Tipton) Archer, violist, was an original member but left the band in 2003 shortly after she married. The current line up includes Sarah Lewis (lead vocals, songwriter, keys), Brad Williams (drums), Just J (guitar), Drew Gilch (Bass) and Jay Daniel (Bass). Although listed as a current member, Jay Daniel has not performed with the band in recent months.  Sarah is a signed songwriter to a publishing company and has had many songs featured all over television, including NBC, ABC Family, FOX, Lifetime, Disney, MTV, A & E, Travel, etc.  The band is currently (as of April 2009) in the studio finishing up album number five.

Awards
Lead singer/songwriter Sarah Lewis has won a number of awards including the overall winner in both the 2002 USA songwriting competition for the song “Mouth”, and the 2006 We Are Listening competition for the song “Does Anybody Know”.  She was runner up in the 2001 John Lennon Songwriting Contest, and winner of the 2007 Next Big Hit competition, which landed Jag Star a week’s feature on iTunes.  In 2007 Sarah was also chosen as a "Wet 'n Wild Fresh Face" and was featured in the company's beauty product national advertising campaign.

AFE Military Tours
Jag Star has completed three AFE tours in support of the United States and Coalition Troops.  These tours included a Middle Eastern tour and Southeast Asian tour in 2003, and Guantanamo Bay, Cuba in 2007.  Countries that the band performed concerts in for Armed Forces Entertainment include Afghanistan, Pakistan, Qatar, Bahrain, Kyrgyzstan, Singapore, Guam, Diego Garcia, Kwajalein, and Guantanamo Bay.

Discography
 2000 The Beginning (The Orchard)
 2002 Crazy Place (Lewpis Music)
 2004 Cinematic (Lewpis Music)
 2006 The Best Impression of Sanity
 2009 Static Bliss

References
Knoxville News Sentinel
Next Big Hit
USA Songwriting Competition Win\
AFE Tour Middle East
East Tennessean

External links
 Jag Star Myspace Page

Musical groups established in 1998
Alternative rock groups from Tennessee